Deh Barez (also Romanized as Deh Bārez, Deh-e Bārez, and Deh-e Bārz; also known as Bārs and Bārz Shovār) is a village in Barez Rural District, Manj District, Lordegan County, Chaharmahal and Bakhtiari Province, Iran. At the 2006 census, its population was 299, in 58 families. The village is populated by Lurs.

References 

Populated places in Lordegan County